Jason Adesanya (born 26 May 1993) is a Belgian footballer who currently plays for K Lyra-Lierse Berlaar.

Career
On 17 May 2019 K Lyra-Lierse Berlaar announced, that Adesanya would join the club for the 2019/20 season.

References

External links

1993 births
Living people
Belgian footballers
Lierse S.K. players
AS Verbroedering Geel players
K.V. Mechelen players
Royal Antwerp F.C. players
Lommel S.K. players
K. Rupel Boom F.C. players
K.S.K. Heist players
Belgian Pro League players
Challenger Pro League players
Belgian people of Nigerian descent
Belgian people of Yoruba descent
Black Belgian sportspeople
Yoruba sportspeople
People from Uccle

Association football defenders
Footballers from Brussels